Neurobiology of Disease is a monthly peer-reviewed scientific journal covering research on disease mechanisms underlying disorders of the nervous system and behavior. It was established in 1994 and is published by Elsevier. The founding editors-in-chief were Dennis Choi and Jacques Mallet. The current editor-in-chief is T. Greenamyre (University of Pittsburgh).

Abstracting and indexing 
The journal is abstracted and indexed in Scopus, Science Citation Index, Current Contents/Life Sciences, and BIOSIS Previews. According to the Journal Citation Reports, the journal has a 2012 impact factor of 5.624.

References

External links 
 

Neuroscience journals
Monthly journals
Elsevier academic journals
Publications established in 1994
English-language journals